HC RT TORAX Poruba is an ice hockey team in Ostrava-Poruba, Czech Republic. They play in the Czech 1.liga, the second level of ice hockey in the Czech Republic. The club was founded as SK Poruba in 1946.

Achievements
Czech 2.liga champion : 2004, 2018.
Promoted to the Czech 1.liga : 2004, 2018.

References

External links
Official website

Poruba
Ice hockey clubs established in 2001
Sport in Ostrava
2001 establishments in the Czech Republic